The Walker Cricket Ground is a trust-operated multi-sport ground at Southgate, in the borough of Enfield and the historic county of Middlesex, London, England. There are three cricket fields, cricket pavilions for two clubs. There are four outdoor tennis courts, and accommodation for rugby union, lacrosse, squash, racketball, hockey, junior-level football, and scout clubs.

The ground, previously Chapel Fields, is named after John Walker, the Middlesex player who founded the ground. It was first used by the Middlesex County Cricket Club 1st XI in 1859, but had to wait until 1991 for its next county match, and until 1998 to become a regular Middlesex venue. The ground is used by Southgate Cricket Club and Southgate Adelaide Cricket Club. Other tenants include Southgate Squash & Racketball Club, Southgate Rugby Club, Oakhill Tigers Football Club, Omonia Youth Football Club, Southgate Weld Tennis Club and Southgate Adelaide Hockey Club.

Game Information:
{| class="wikitable"
|-
! Game Type
! No. of Games
|-
| County Championship Matches
| 18
|-
| limited-over county matches
| 20
|-
| Twenty20 matches
| 4
|}

Game Statistics: first-class:
{| class="wikitable"
|-
! Category
! Information
|-
| Highest Team Score
| Middlesex (695/5dec against Leicestershire) in 2003
|-
| Lowest Team Score
| Kent (47 against Middlesex) in 1859
|-
| Best Batting Performance
| Mike Gatting (241 Runs for Middlesex against Essex) in 1998
|-
| Best Bowling Performance
| George Wigzell (7/21 for Kent against Middlesex) in 1859
|}

Game Statistics: one-day matches:
{| class="wikitable"
|-
! Category
! Information
|-
| Highest Team Score
| Middlesex (337/5 in 45 overs against Somerset) in 2003
|-
| Lowest Team Score
| Somerset (58 in 28.3 overs against Middlesex) in 2000
|-
| Best Batting Performance
| Owais Shah (125 Runs for Middlesex against Yorkshire) in 2004
|-
| Best Bowling Performance
| Ashley Cowan (5/14 for Essex against Middlesex) in 2001
|}

Game Statistics: Twenty20:
{| class="wikitable"
|-
! Category
! Information
|-
| Highest Team Score
| Middlesex (185/6 in 20 overs against Essex) in 2005
|-
| Lowest Team Score
| Hampshire (111 in 19.3 overs against Middlesex) in 2006
|-
| Best Batting Performance
| Owais Shah (79 Runs for Middlesex against Essex) in 2005
|-
| Best Bowling Performance
| Johann Louw (4/18 for Middlesex against Hampshire) in 2006
|}

References

External links
 
 The Walker Cricket Ground 'Official Website'
 Cricinfo Website - Ground Page
 Cricket Archive page

Cricket grounds in London
Sport in the London Borough of Enfield
Southgate, London
Cricket grounds in Middlesex